The 2018 FIVB Women's World Championship was the eighteenth edition of the event, contested by the senior women's national teams of the members of the  (FIVB), the sport's global governing body. The final tournament was held in Japan from 29 September to 20 October 2018. The final four was held at the Yokohama Arena in Yokohama.

Serbia won their first world title, defeating Italy in five sets at the final. This was the first all-European final in the Women's World Championship history and the first final since 1990 that not featured a team from the Americas. Reigning olympic champions China won the third place match, defeating Netherlands in straight sets. For the first time since the 1974 Championship in Mexico, no team from the Americas reached the final four. Tijana Bošković from Serbia was elected the MVP.

Host selection
On 25 August 2014, FIVB announced that the tournament would be held in Japan for the third time in twelve years and the fifth time overall. The tournament will take place in six cities: Hamamatsu, Kobe, Nagoya, Osaka, Sapporo, and Yokohama.

Japan hosted the Women's World Championship on four previous occasions: 1967, 1998, 2006, and 2010. Moreover, Japan also hosted the Men's World Championship in 1998 and 2006. The country has also played hosts to other important volleyball competitions, including the Asian Women's Volleyball Championship and the World Grand Prix final round.

Qualification

The qualification process was a series of tournaments organised by the five FIVB confederations to decide 22 of the 24 teams which would play in the final tournament, with Japan qualifying automatically as hosts and United States also qualifying automatically as the defending champions. All remaining FIVB member associations were eligible to enter the qualifying process.

At first, 160 associations registered teams to compete in the qualification process, but 46 associations withdrew from the qualifying process after they registered and India were suspended and then expelled from taking part in the process as a punishment for internal problems in the India Volleyball Federation.

The five regional governing bodies were allocated the remaining 22 spots; CAVB (Africa) was granted two, AVC (Asia and Oceania) four, NORCECA (North America) six, CSV (South America) two, and CEV (Europe) eight spots.

Of the 24 nations qualified to play at the 2018 World Championship, 21 countries competed at the previous tournament in 2014. Trinidad and Tobago qualified for the first time. Other teams returning after absences of the last tournament(s) include Kenya and South Korea, who both missed the 2014 edition.

Squads

Venues

Format
First round
In the first round, the 24 teams are spread across four pools of six teams playing in a round-robin system. The top four teams from each pool advance to the second round.

Second round
In the second round, the 16 teams are allocated in two pools of eight teams (top teams from first round pools A and D in one and top teams from pools B and C in the other). Once again a round-robin system is used in each pool, teams coming from the same first round pool (therefore already played each other) only play against opponents from a different first round pool. The second round standings takes into account the points scored by each team in the first and second rounds. The top three teams of each group will access the third round.

Third round
The six teams competing in the third round are divided into two three-team pools by a draw, with the first place teams from the previous round securing the head position of both pools. After the matches played once again in a round-robin system, the top two in each pool qualify for the semifinals and finals while the third placed teams from each pool play a fifth place match.

Final round
The third round pool winners play against the runners-up in this round. The semifinals winners advance to compete for the World Championship title. The losers face each other in the third place match.

Pools composition

First round
Teams were seeded in the first two positions of each pool following the Serpentine system according to their FIVB World Ranking as of 7 August 2017. FIVB reserved the right to seed the hosts as heads of pool A regardless of the World Ranking. All teams not seeded were drawn to take other available positions in the remaining lines following the World Ranking. Each pool had no more than three teams from the same confederation. The draw was held in Tokyo, Japan on 7 December 2017. Rankings as of 7 August 2017 are shown in brackets, except the hosts Japan who ranked sixth.

Draw

Second round

Third round
Third round draw took place at Nippon Gaishi Hall, Nagoya on 11 October 2018.

Pool standing procedure
 Total number of victories (matches won, matches lost)
 In the event of a tie, the following first tiebreaker will apply: The teams will be ranked by the most point gained per match as follows:
 Match won 3–0 or 3–1: 3 points for the winner, 0 points for the loser
 Match won 3–2: 2 points for the winner, 1 point for the loser
 Match forfeited: 3 points for the winner, 0 points (0–25, 0–25, 0–25) for the loser
 If teams are still tied after examining the number of victories and points gained, then the FIVB will examine the results in order to break the tie in the following order:
 Set quotient: if two or more teams are tied on the number of points gained, they will be ranked by the quotient resulting from the division of the number of all set won by the number of all sets lost.
 Points quotient: if the tie persists based on the set quotient, the teams will be ranked by the quotient resulting from the division of all points scored by the total of points lost during all sets.
 If the tie persists based on the point quotient, the tie will be broken based on the team that won the match of the Round Robin Phase between the tied teams. When the tie in point quotient is between three or more teams, these teams ranked taking into consideration only the matches involving the teams in question.

Results
All times are Japan Standard Time (UTC+09:00).

First round

Pool A

|}

|}

Pool B

|}

|}

Pool C

|}

|}

Pool D

|}

|}

Second round

Pool E

|}

|}

Pool F

|}

|}

Third round

Pool G

|}

|}

Pool H

|}

|}

Final round

Semifinals

|}

5th place match

|}

3rd place match

|}

Final

|}

Final standing

Awards

 Most Valuable Player
  Tijana Bošković
 Best Setter
  Ofelia Malinov
 Best Outside Spikers
  Miriam Sylla
  Zhu Ting

 Best Middle Blockers
  Yan Ni
  Milena Rašić
 Best Opposite Spiker
  Paola Egonu
 Best Libero
  Monica De Gennaro

Statistics leaders

The statistics of each group follows the vis reports P2 and P3. The statistics include 6 volleyball skills; serve, reception, set, spike, block, and dig. The table below shows the top 5 ranked players in each skill plus top scorers at the completion of the tournament. Only players whose teams advanced to the third round are taken in consideration.

Marketing

Sponsors
 Mikasa Sports
 Senoh
 Gerflor
 Asics
 Salonpas
 Volleyball TV
 Kobe
 Volleyball World app
 Japanet
 Schenker AG
 Imuse
 Yokohama
 Sapporo
 Hamamatsu
 Osaka
 Nagoya
 Ganten Water

Local performance
According to Japan leading news paper 朝日新聞, the two Japanese local business partner were reported to lost money on hosting the competition. TBS is expected to lose nearly 1 billion yen due to bad sales at commercial advertisements. And JVA was expected to lose 600 million yen as the drop of ticket selling.

Broadcasting
FIVB, through several companies, sold the broadcasting rights for the 2018 World Championship to the following broadcasters.

See also

2018 FIVB Volleyball Men's World Championship

References

External links
 Fédération Internationale de Volleyball – official website
 2018 Women's World Championship – official website
 Competition Formula

 
2018
FIVB World Championship
Volleyball, World Championship
World Championship, Women, 2018
September 2018 sports events in Japan
October 2018 sports events in Japan
World Championship, 2018
Hamamatsu
Sport in Kobe
Sports competitions in Nagoya
Sport in Osaka
Sport in Sapporo
Sport in Yokohama
Sport in Shizuoka Prefecture